Dušan Fitzel (born 15 April 1963) is a Czech football coach and a former player. He is an assistant coach with FC Viktoria Plzeň.

He managed the Malta national football team from 2006–2009, but in July 2009 health problems made it necessary to give up the role of manager. He is married and has two children.  He is a lecturer in coach education as well as a contributor of articles on football and coaching in Fotbal a trénink.

Playing career
For the most part of his career Fitzel played in the Czechoslovakian league for Dukla Prague in the position of defensive midfielder. In 158 appearances he scored three goals. In 1992, he left for EPA Larnaca in Cyprus where he had 42 appearances and scored three goals. Fitzel retired from his career as a professional footballer in 1995 for FK Chmel Blšany.

Coaching career
His coaching career Fitzel started  with the youth team of SK Slavia Praha. From 1998 to 2005 Fitzel worked within the Football Association of the Czech Republic, coaching teams from U18 to U21 level. His greatest achievement came when with him as assistant coach the Czech U21 team won the European Under-21 Championship in 2002.  In January 2006 he was appointed the head coach for Malta as the successor to Horst Heese. His contract expires with the end of 2007.

The Maltese national team results under Fitzel have been rather promising, including a 2-1 victory over Hungary (first win for the team in official games since 1993) and a 2-2 draw against the 2002 World Cup bronze  medalists Turkey. Dusan Fitzel has been nicknamed "La Valette" in Malta after the Maltese grandmaster and hero Jean de la Valette.

Honours
Czechoslovak First League:
Runner-up (2): 1983-84, 1987–88
Czechoslovak Football Cup:
Winner (2): 1985, 1990

References

External links
 

Living people
1963 births
Czech footballers
Slovak footballers
Czechoslovak footballers
Dukla Prague footballers
FK Chmel Blšany players
Cypriot First Division players
Expatriate footballers in Cyprus
Czech football managers
Czech expatriate football managers
Czech expatriate footballers
Slovak football managers
Slovak expatriate football managers
Slovak expatriate sportspeople in Malta
Slovak expatriate footballers
Expatriate footballers in Malta
Expatriate football managers in Malta
Malta national football team managers
Expatriate football managers in Russia
Association football midfielders
Czech people of Slovak descent
Sportspeople from Bojnice